The men's competition in 77 kg division was staged on September 20–21, 2007.

Schedule

Medalists

Records

Results

References
Results 

Men's 77